Anthony Walters may refer to:

 Anthony Walters (American football), American football player
 Anthony Walters (cricketer), Tasmanian cricketer
 Anthony Walters, one of the Candidates of the Australian federal election, 1983
 Anthony Walters, actor in Shining Through

See also
 Tony Walters, Australian actor and director
 Vernon Anthony Walters, U.S. soldier and diplomat